Minuartia rosei is an uncommon species of flowering plant in the family Caryophyllaceae known by the common names peanut sandwort and peanut stitchwort.

It is endemic to northwestern California, in the Klamath Mountains and North California Coast Ranges.  It grows in serpentine soils in oak and pine woodlands and forests.

Description
Minuartia rosei  is a rhizomatous perennial herb forming a low mat of waxy herbage with thin, erect flowering stems. The tiny green needle-like leaves are up to 1.5 centimeters long and less than 2 millimeters wide.

The hairy, glandular inflorescence bears flowers with five white petals each under a centimeter long.

External links
Jepson Manual Treatment: Minuartia rosei
USDA Plants Profile
Flora of North America
Minuartia rosei — Photo gallery

rosei
Endemic flora of California
Flora of the Klamath Mountains
Natural history of the California Coast Ranges
Flora without expected TNC conservation status